Russell Keith McCormmach (born 9 October 1933), the husband of the late Christa Jungnickel, is an American historian of physics.

McCormmach grew up in Walla Walla, Washington and studied physics at Washington State College with bachelor's degree in 1955. As a Rhodes scholar, he studied politics, philosophy and economics at Oxford University with bachelor's degree in 1959. He then worked as an electronics engineer at Bell Laboratories. In 1967 he received a Ph.D. in the history of science from Case Institute of Technology under Martin J. Klein. McCormmach was then a professor of the history of science at the University of Pennsylvania and the Johns Hopkins University (until 1983), and then at the University of Oregon. There he is a professor emeritus.

McCormmach studied the history of German physics in the 19th and 20th centuries.   His novel Night Thoughts of a Classical Physicist consists of the fictional reminiscences of an elderly German physics professor named Viktor Jacob who reflects on the revolutionary developments (relativity theory, quantum theory, and atomic physics) at the beginning of 20th century physics. The fictional character Viktor Jacob is partly based on Paul Drude (who committed suicide in 1906). In the novel, Viktor Jacob recalls Paul Drude as a friend.

With his wife Christa Jungnickel, Russell McCormmach co-authored a biography of Henry Cavendish and a history of German theoretical physics in the 19th and early 20th century. His biography of the 18th century English naturalist John Michell was published in 2012.

McCormmach received in 1987 the Pfizer Award from the History of Science Society, the John Frederick Lewis Award from the American Philosophical Society, and in 2010 the Abraham Pais Prize for History of Physics from the American Physical Society.

In 1969 he founded the journal Historical Studies in the Physical Sciences (now named Historical Studies in the Natural Sciences), for which he was the editor-in-chief for its first ten years.

Selected publications 
 Night Thoughts of a Classical Physicist. Harvard University Press 1982)
 with Christa Jungnickel: Intellectual Mastery of Nature: Theoretical Physics from Ohm to Einstein. 2 vols., University of Chicago Press 1986, 1990. vol. I The torch of mathematics 1800-1870, vol. II The now mighty theoretical physics 1870-1925, 
 with Christa Jungnickel: Cavendish. American Philosophical Society 1996
 with Christa Jungnickel: Cavendish - the Experimental Life, Bucknell University Press 1999, 
 Speculative Truth: Henry Cavendish, Natural Philosophy, and the Rise of Modern Theoretical Science. Oxford University Press 2004, 
  Weighing the World. The Reverend John Michell of Thornhill. Springer, Dordrecht-Heidelberg-London-New York 2012, e-
 The Personality of Henry Cavendish - a Great Scientist with Extraordinary Peculiarities. Vol. 36. Springer 2014,

References

Historians of science
Washington State University alumni
Alumni of the University of Oxford
University of Oregon faculty
Johns Hopkins University faculty
University of Pennsylvania faculty
1933 births
Living people
Scientists at Bell Labs
People from Walla Walla, Washington